Olmo Gentile is a comune (municipality) in the Province of Asti in the Italian region Piedmont, located about  southeast of Turin and about  south of Asti.

Olmo Gentile borders Perletto, Roccaverano, San Giorgio Scarampi, and Serole.

References

External links
 Official website

Cities and towns in Piedmont